Amin Yusefinezhad (born 11 January 1996) is an Iranian handball player who plays for Espérance Sportive de Tunis and the Iran national handball team.

References 

://www.facebook.com/pg/ahcdunareacalarasi2014/photos/?tab=album&album_id=2630747923862398

1996 births
Living people
Iranian male handball players
People from Nowshahr
Sportspeople from Mazandaran province
21st-century Iranian people